Takafumi Suzuki (鈴木 崇文, born November 17, 1987) is a Japanese football player for Thespakusatsu Gunma.

Club statistics
Updated to 23 February 2019.

References

External links

Profile at Thespakusatsu Gunma

1987 births
Living people
Tokyo Gakugei University alumni
Association football people from Ibaraki Prefecture
Japanese footballers
J2 League players
J3 League players
Japan Football League players
FC Machida Zelvia players
Fagiano Okayama players
Thespakusatsu Gunma players
Association football midfielders